Clandestinos is a 1987 Cuban film directed by Fernando Pérez. The film chronicles the last days of the revolutionary struggle against Fulgencio Batista in Cuba as seen via the romance between two clandestine fighters who work on an underground printing press used to print subversive pamphlets against the government.

Cast
 Luis Alberto García
 Isabel Santos
 Amado del Pino
 Susana Pérez

Awards
- Best Actress (Isabel Santos) - Havana Film Festival.

See also 
 List of Cuban films

External links

1987 films
Cuban drama films
Films set in Cuba
1980s Spanish-language films